Audrey Werro (born 27 March 2004) is a Swiss track and field athlete. She won the silver medal in the 800 metres at the 2022 World Under-20 Championships and a gold at the 2021 European U20 Championships.

Werro claimed youth and senior Swiss titles indoors and outdoors, and holds national records at U18 and U20 levels.

Career
From Fribourg, Audrey Werro became the 2021 European Under-20 champion over 800 metres in Tallinn, at 17 years-old. That year she set new Swiss national U18 records over 400 and 800 metres. She was also runner-up in the 800 m at the Swiss Championships, running 2:02.88 to finish behind champion Lore Hoffmann.

In February 2022, Werro set a new Swiss U20 indoor record in the 400 metres, running 53.03 in Magglingen. She next became the Swiss national champion over 800 metres, running 2:04.95 also in Magglingen. She later became the Swiss 800 m outdoor champion too, clocking 2:02.72 in Zürich. In June that year, Werro broke the Swiss under-20 and under-23 records, previously held by Delia Sclabas (2:01.29), when she ran 2:00:28 in Geneva. She won the silver medal at the 2022 World U20 Championships held in Cali, Colombia, running 1:59.53, but was edged out for gold by Roisin Willis for whom it was also the first time she had ran sub-two minutes in a 800 m race. Werro made her debut in the senior championships at the 2022 European Championships in Munich. In December 2022, she was nominated, alongside cross-country skier and triathlete Anja Weber and cyclist Jan Christen, for Radio SRF 3's "Best Talent Sport".

In early February 2023, she ran an indoor 800 m personal best of 2:00.57 in Val-de-Reuil. This came within 19 hundredths of Selina Rutz-Büchel's Swiss record and came a week after Werro had lowered Rutz-Büchel’s 600 m national record to 1:26.14. In March 2023, at the 2023 European Athletics Indoor Championships, held in Istanbul, Werro came through two qualifying rounds to reach the final. She finished fifth in a time of 2:00.90, six-hundredths of a second away from bronze.

Personal bests
 400 metres – 53.74 (Zofingen 2021) 
 400 metres indoor – 53.03 (Magglingen 2022) 
 600 metres – 1:26.61 (Langenthal 2021)  
 600 metres indoor – 1:26.14 (Magglingen 2023) 
 800 metres – 1:59.53 (Cali 2022) 
 800 metres indoor – 2:00.57 (Val-de-Reuil 2023)

References

External links
 

2004 births
Living people
Swiss female middle-distance runners
Sportspeople from the canton of Fribourg